The 2021 California's 79th State Assembly district special election was held on April 6, 2021. Democratic nominee Akilah Weber defeated Republican nominee Marco Contreras and three other Democratic candidates to succeed Shirley Weber in the California State Assembly.

Weber, who had served in the state assembly since her election in 2012, was appointed to serve as Secretary of State of California. Governor Gavin Newsom called a special election which was won by Weber's daughter in the primary without the need of the second top-two election.

Background
Shirley Weber was elected to the California State Assembly from the 79th district during the 2012 election. Alex Padilla, the Secretary of State of California, resigned from his position after being appointed to the United States Senate and James Schwab was selected to serve as interim Secretary of State. Weber was appointed by Governor Gavin Newsom on December 22, 2020, to serve as Secretary of State and was sworn in on January 29, 2021.

On February 2, Newsom called a special election for the 79th district with a primary held on April 6, and the general held on June 8.

Campaign

Akilah Weber, the daughter of Weber, Aeiramique Glass Blake, a member of the San Diego Chief of Police Board of Advisors and the San Diego City Attorney’s Advisory Board, Leticia Munguia, an investigator for the San Diego Alternate Public Defender, and Shane Suzanne Parmely, a teacher, ran in the election as member of the Democratic Party. Marco Contreras ran as a member of the Republican Party.

Ammar Campa-Najjar, who had unsuccessfully ran for a seat in the United States House of Representatives in the 2018 and 2020 elections, announced that he would not run after having formed an exploratory committee stating that the district should be represented by a woman of color.

Weber won in the primary with over fifty percent of the popular vote which resulted in her becoming a member of the state assembly without the second top-two election being held.

Declared
 Aeiramique Glass Blake (Democratic), advisor to San Diego Chief of Police and City Attorney
 Marco Contreras (Republican), small business owner
 Leticia Munguia (Democratic), investigator
 Shane Suzanne Parmely (Democratic), educator
 Akilah Weber (Democratic), pediatrician and daughter of Shirley Weber

Declined

Endorsements

Finance

Polling

Results

References

State Assembly 79 Special
California State Assembly elections
California State Assembly 2021 District 79
California Assembly District 79 special